Leroy Harry Edwards (April 11, 1914 – August 25, 1971), nicknamed "Cowboy" and "Lefty", was one of the greatest basketball players of his era. He was an NCAA All-American  at the University of Kentucky and also one of the most lauded professional players in the United States' National Basketball League's history.

High school
Edwards was a  center who starred at Arsenal Technical High School in Indianapolis, Indiana. Back then, he was known as the "East Side Terror", and it was between his sophomore and junior years that he learned how to do a hook shot after watching a barn-storming basketball team perform the feat. He played for the varsity team in 1930–31, 1931–32 and 1932–33, leading the team in scoring his final two seasons while also helping to win the Indianapolis City Crown all three of his varsity seasons. Edwards was an all-state player who twice led the North Central Conference in scoring and also led Arsenal to the state quarterfinals as a junior in an era when there were no divisional breakdowns based on school enrollment. In his senior season of 1932–33, Arsenal Tech lost in the sectional final against Shortridge High School, a team they had beaten twice during the regular season, but still finished the year with a 22–3 record.

College

Edwards played one season of varsity basketball at the University of Kentucky. Due to NCAA rules, college freshmen were not allowed to play varsity sports at the time. As a freshman in 1933–34, he set a college scoring record 24 points per game in 17 games as he guided the Kentucky freshmen team to an undefeated season.

In 1934–35, his sophomore year and his first of varsity eligibility, he led the Wildcats to a 19–2 record. Averaging nearly 20 ppg, he set a single season point record that lasted until 1947 when teams began playing more games each season. One loss was to a very good Michigan State squad (32–26) and the other to New York University (NYU) at the old Madison Square Garden.

NYU game
NYU and Kentucky were considered the best two college teams in the country at that time and playing for the national championship. A then-record 16,500 fans attended the match. A controversy occurred when sports writers said that Kentucky would have won this game if the two NYU players who were hanging onto Edwards throughout the game had fouls called on them. NYU won the game, 23–22.

Three-second rule
Edwards is generally recognized as the player responsible for the implementation of the three-second rule. Enacted in 1936, it was originally designed to limit rough play near the basket. The rule limits the time players can remain in the area in front of the basket known as the "paint" or free-throw lane. The rule has been modified and is still used today.

Early exit
In a different game that season, Edwards set another college basketball record, scoring 34 points against Creighton University. After coach Adolph Rupp's retirement in 1972 he was asked who was the best center he had ever seen play the game and his answer was Leroy Edwards. He said Edwards was the strongest player that he ever coached and he played above the rim. Edwards, selected to the First Team All-Southeastern Conference, was also named the Helms Athletic Foundation National College Player of the Year. Edwards left the University of Kentucky after just his sophomore year—an extremely rare decision for basketball players during that era—to start what would become an historical professional basketball career.

Professional career

When Edwards decided to play professional basketball he was considered the premier player in the country. In 1936 he signed his first pro contract with the Oshkosh All-Stars, a team in Wisconsin that played in the  National Basketball League (NBL). This league was the forerunner to the National Basketball Association (NBA). He played for them from 1936 to 1949.

He was a prolific scorer with either hand, left or right, could shoot from the outside and was an excellent defensive player. He accomplished so much at a time when game scores and point totals were much lower than today. In those days, the actual playing time was shorter. The game had 15–17 minute halves and no 24 second shot clock. Play was slower and teams would play zone defense and hold on to the ball for long periods of time, making it very difficult for a player to score many points in a game. Today, NBA games consist of four 12 minute quarters and each team takes over 75 shots per game.

Edwards held a number of game scoring records. He was the first professional basketball player to score 35 points in a game when he did so against the Fort Wayne Zollner Pistons on March 5, 1942. He led the NBL in scoring his first three years and in 1939 he led the league in every recorded offensive statistic. He ended his career as the second highest scorer in National Basketball League history.

During Edwards's 12-year career, he was selected to the NBL First Team All-League six times and the Second Team All-League twice. He was also the League MVP three times. Oshkosh won the league championship six times and participated in 9 of 10 World Tournaments held in Chicago between 1939 and 1948. Edwards' team had the best record of all teams that were invited to the World Championship Tournaments, winning 20 games and losing 10. The Oshkosh All Stars were crowned the World Professional Champions in Chicago in 1942, and Edwards was the all-time leading point scorer in World Championship Tournament history. On February 14, 1945, United Press International recognized him as one of the Top 5 Basketball Players of All Time.

New York Rens rivalry
The New York Renaissance (Rens, for short) was the best black team of the era 1920–1940s. As in most sports, times were very difficult for black players. Nevertheless, the Rens were an excellent team with quality players; their record for the 1939 season was 112 wins and 7 losses. The epitome of their success came that year in Chicago at the first World Basketball Championship Tournament. The Rens had reached the finals and were playing the Oshkosh All-Stars. Oshkosh was favored because with Edwards at center, the All-Stars had beaten the Rens 7 out of 10 games they had played during the previous two years. That night the Rens beat Oshkosh 34–25. Edwards was the leading scorer of the tournament, scoring 49 points in three games, including a 12-point performance in the final.

In total, the New York Rens and Oshkosh All-Stars played each other 33 times, with Oshkosh holding the edge with 17 wins. The entire New York Rens team is in the Naismith Basketball Hall of Fame. Their team played over 3000 games and won 85% of them.

John Isaacs, a member of the Hall of Fame Rens team, was asked about Edwards. His comments were that Edwards was a great player who could play in any era. Isaacs also said that Edwards never complained to the officials during a game and would play hard. He added that Hall of Famer Tarzan Cooper and Edwards would talk to each other during the games. He recalled one game when Edwards said something to Cooper about a rough move that he made. Cooper responded by quipping 'who do you think I learned it from?'

George Mikan match-ups
Mikan, however, did not get the opportunity to play against Edwards when Edwards was in his prime. They played against each other when Edwards was older and having chronic knee problems. Still, whenever they met on the court Edwards usually had the upper hand. When Mikan was asked who was the best player he ever faced he did not hesitate to say that it was Leroy Edwards.

Hall of Famer Ray Meyer, Mikan's coach at DePaul University, wrote that Edwards was not merely a good basketball player, but a great one. Meyer was impressed with his agility. Edwards, he wrote, had a great move with his back to the basket. He would turn left, dribble with his right hand and he'd use his left hand to push the defender out of the way. As long as his move wasn't too obvious, the ref would not call a foul. Meyer said this was the first time he ever saw that move.

Death

Edwards died of a heart attack on August 25, 1971, at roughly 7:30 p.m., at the age of 57 at his home in Lawrence, Indiana while mowing his yard. His wife and bystanders attempted to resuscitate him, but were unsuccessful, and he was pronounced dead at arrival at the hospital. He had been an employee of Chrysler's Indianapolis plant before his death.

Legacy

Whether Leroy Edwards was playing college basketball for Kentucky or professionally against the New York Renaissance, Harlem Globetrotters or the Fort Wayne Zollner Pistons, he contributed to basketball's development and popularity in the United States. He excited fans in an era without television coverage and very little radio publicity. Edwards, a pioneer of basketball, is in the Indiana Basketball Hall of Fame, Helms Athletic Foundation Hall of Fame and the University of Kentucky's Athletics Hall of Fame. Though as of 2022, despite being a nominee numerous times, he has yet to be inducted in the Naismith Basketball Hall of Fame.

Awards and accolades
The following is a more comprehensive list of Edwards' myriad awards, accolades and records than could reasonably be placed in an infobox. (Sources)

Indianapolis Arsenal Tech
3× Arsenal Tech team were Indianapolis City tournament champions
2× team's leading scorer
2× All-North Central Conference
2× All-State

College
School freshman scoring record 24 points per game  (over 400 points)
School single game scoring record (34 points) in a game against Creighton, a record which stood until 1949
Leading scorer in the South (343 points) in 1935
343 points scored in 21 games was the highest season points scored by a Kentucky player until 1947, when it was broken in a 37-game season
Points per game average of 16.3 was the highest per game average of any Kentucky player until 1945
1935 Consensus All-American (Helms 1st Team, Converse 2nd Team)
Credited with the introduction of the 3-second rule, which forbid an offensive player from remaining inside the free-throw lane (with or without the ball) for longer than three seconds; this rule was instituted in 1936
1930s All-Decade Team selection by the National Association of Basketball Coaches (NABC)
Madison Square Garden All-Decade Team (1934–1943)
Associated Press All-Time Collegiate Team (as of February 1943)
Adolph Rupp's All-Star Kentucky Squad (1930–1972) as named in John McGill's book Kentucky Sports

Professional
6× NBL Western Division championships with the Oshkosh All-Stars: 1938, 1939, 1940, 1941, 1942, 1946
2× NBL championships: 1941, 1942
Scored a record 30 points in game against Kankakee (first NBL player to score 30+ points in a professional game) in 1937–38
3× NBL scoring leader: 1938 (16.2 ppg), 1939 (11.9 ppg), 1940 (12.9 ppg)
3× NBL MVP: 1938, 1939, 1940
6× All-NBL First Team: 1938, 1939, 1940, 1941, 1942, 1945
2× All-NBL Second Team: 1943, 1946
In 1938–39, lead league in every recorded offensive statistic
3× World Professional Basketball Tournament (WPBL) All-Tournament First Team: 1939, 1940, 1946
All-time leading scorer in WPBL history
All-time NBL League team honoree
Second in all-time scoring in the NBL (3,221 points in 322 games for an average of 10.0 ppg)

Career
United Press International selection as one of top 5 greatest professional players all-time (1945)
Helms Athletic Foundation Basketball Hall of Fame inductee (1971)
Indiana Basketball Hall of Fame inductee
 Association of Professional Basketball Researchers (APBR) Top-100 Professional Basketball Players of the 20th Century
 University of Kentucky's Athletics Hall of Fame inductee (2012)

See also
Honored Kentucky Wildcats men's basketball players

References

1914 births
1971 deaths
All-American college men's basketball players
Amateur Athletic Union men's basketball players
Basketball players from Indianapolis
Centers (basketball)
Indianapolis Kautskys players
Kentucky Wildcats men's basketball players
Oshkosh All-Stars players
People from Crawfordsville, Indiana
American men's basketball players
Arsenal Technical High School alumni